A by-election was held for the New South Wales Legislative Assembly electorate of Redfern on 8 October 1949 because of the death of George Noble.

The Cessnock by-election was held on the same day.

Dates

Result

The by-election was caused by the death of George Noble.

Aftermath
Kevin Dwyer did not serve for long, losing pre-selection for the 1950 state election and retiring from politics.

See also
Electoral results for the district of Redfern
List of New South Wales state by-elections

References

1949 elections in Australia
New South Wales state by-elections
1940s in New South Wales
October 1949 events in Australia